Scutellastra granularis is a species of sea snail, a true limpet, a marine gastropod mollusk in the family Patellidae, one of the families of true limpets.

References

Patellidae
Gastropods described in 1758
Taxa named by Carl Linnaeus